Willowbank is a rural locality in the City of Ipswich, Queensland, Australia.

Geography 
The Cunningham Highway passes through the suburb from north to south.

Both the Willowbank Raceway and Queensland Raceway are located in the Ipswich Motorsport Precinct at Willowbank.

History 
The name was introduced when "Willowbank Estate" was advertised for sale in February 1887.

Amenities 
The Ipswich City Council operates a fortnightly mobile library service which visits Heit Park.

References

External links 

 

City of Ipswich
Localities in Queensland